The Allemarinda and James Wyer House is a Victorian cottage beside Lake Minnetonka in Excelsior, Minnesota, United States. It was built in 1887 and added to the National Register of Historic Places in 1976.  Its nomination form called it the largest and best preserved of Excelsior's Eastlake style summer homes built around 1880.  From 1925 through 1974, it served as the home for managers of the Excelsior Amusement Park.

References 

Houses in Hennepin County, Minnesota
Houses on the National Register of Historic Places in Minnesota
National Register of Historic Places in Hennepin County, Minnesota